Jakob Warburg Johansson (born 6 August 1998) is a Danish professional footballer who plays as a forward for Danish 1st Division club Fremad Amager.

Club career

Nordsjælland
Johansson is a product of FC Nordsjælland, where he played since he was U15 player. He got his debut for FC Nordsjælland on 7 August 2016. Johansson started on the bench, but replaced Mathias Jensen in the 56th minute in a 1-2 defeat against AaB in the Danish Superliga.

FC Nordsjælland confirmed on 6 June 2017, that they had extended Johansson's contract and promoted him to the first team squad.

Loan to Randers
On 31 January 2018, Johansson was loaned out to Randers FC with an option to buy, for the rest of the season.

HB Køge
On 7 August 2018 Johansson was sent on another loan. This time he was loaned to HB Køge in the Danish 1st Division for the entire 2018–19 season. Johansson had a good spell at the club, scoring 15 goals in 30 games. The club announced on 14 June 2019, that he would continue at the club, signing a permanent two-year contract with the player.

Johansson left Køge at the end of the 2020-21 season.

Fremad Amager
On 6 July 2021, Johansson signed with Danish 1st Division club Fremad Amager on a free agent.

References

External links
 
 Jakob Johansson at DBU

1998 births
Living people
Danish men's footballers
Denmark youth international footballers
People from Hvidovre Municipality
Association football forwards
Danish Superliga players
Danish 1st Division players
FC Nordsjælland players
Randers FC players
HB Køge players
Fremad Amager players
Sportspeople from the Capital Region of Denmark